Party for Your Life is the third album by Canadian rap rock band Down with Webster. The album was officially released on January 28, 2014. It contained three singles, "One in a Million", "Party for Your Life" and "Chills".

Background and release
In an interview, member Cameron Hunter stated that the album was "a lot more uptempo" than their previous albums. Bassist Tyler Armes said in another interview that, "There has definitely been a step made — I just don't think it was a conscious change in any direction. We like to think we are just getting better at what we are doing."

Party for Your Life was released on January 28, 2014 and peaked at number two on Billboard Canadian Albums. The album sold 6,500 copies, 500 copies more than their previous album Time to Win, Vol. 2. 

It was also nominated for Pop Album of the Year of the 2015 Juno Awards.

Singles
"One in a Million" was the first single released from the album and peaked at 27 on the Billboard Canadian Hot 100. It also reached number 12 on Canada CHR/Top 40 and number 22 on Canada Hot AC. The song would go on to be certified platinum. The second single, "Party for Your Life", was released on August 13, 2013 and peaked at number 67 on the Billboard Canadian Hot 100. "Chills" was the third single and peaked at number 19 on the Billboard Canadian Hot 100. It also hit the Canada CHR/Top 40 at number 13, Canada Hot AC at number 16 and Canada AC at number 21. The song sold 78,000 digital copies according to Nielsen Music and was certified platinum in 2014.

Track listing

Charts

References

Down with Webster albums
2014 albums